John P. Welle is an American professor of Italian Studies and translator of poems from Italian to English.

Life
He graduated from St. John's University and Indiana University with an MFA and PhD. His poetry and translations have appeared in Dacotah Territory, The Cresset, The Juggler, Modern Poetry in Translation, and World Literature Today.

He lives in Indiana and teaches at the University of Notre Dame.

Awards
 Fulbright Commission
 National Endowment for the Humanities.
 1999 Welle and Ruth Feldman received the Raiziss/de Palchi Book Prize

Works

Editor

Translation

Criticism

References

Year of birth missing (living people)
Living people
St. John's University (New York City) alumni
Indiana University alumni
University of Notre Dame faculty